Benečija is a settlement in the Municipality of Trebnje in eastern Slovenia. It lies on the right bank of the Temenica River, just southwest of Trebnje. The area is part of the historical Lower Carniola region. The municipality is now included in the Southeast Slovenia Statistical Region.

Iron Age and Roman-period artefacts have been found at sites near the settlement.

References

External links
Benečija at Geopedia

Populated places in the Municipality of Trebnje